Rhondda West by-election may refer to one of two by-elections held in the British House of Commons constituency of Rhondda West:

 1920 Rhondda West by-election
 1967 Rhondda West by-election